Raymond James Terrell (born 5 May 1953) is a retired English swimmer who won seven medals at the British Commonwealth Games.

Swimming career
He competed at the 1968 Summer Olympics in the 200 m and 400 m individual medley and in the 4×200 m freestyle relay, but failed to reach the finals.

He represented England and won four medals, a double silver in the 2000 metres backstroke and 400 metres medley and a double bronze in the freestyle relay events, at the 1970 British Commonwealth Games in Edinburgh, Scotland. Four years later he won a further three medals for the England team, at the 1974 British Commonwealth Games in Christchurch, New Zealand; a silver and bronze in the freestyle relay events and a bronze medal in the 400 metres medley.

At the ASA National British Championships he won the 1970 400 metres freestyle title,  the 200 metres medley title in 1972 and the 400 metres medley title in 1972.

References

1953 births
Living people
Sportspeople from Southampton
Olympic swimmers of Great Britain
Swimmers at the 1968 Summer Olympics
English male freestyle swimmers
Male backstroke swimmers
Male medley swimmers
Swimmers at the 1970 British Commonwealth Games
Swimmers at the 1974 British Commonwealth Games
Commonwealth Games medallists in swimming
Commonwealth Games silver medallists for England
Commonwealth Games bronze medallists for England
Medallists at the 1970 British Commonwealth Games
Medallists at the 1974 British Commonwealth Games